Zurich Concert is an album by German jazz saxophonist Ingrid Laubrock, which was recorded live in 2011 at the Rote Fabrik in Zurich and released on the Swiss Intakt label.

Background
The Ingrid Laubrock Octet grew out of her London based nine piece ensemble Nein. In 2011 the saxophonist was offered the opportunity by Southwest German Radio (SWR) to work with her octet for several days at the "SWR NewJazz Meeting" in Baden-Baden, to develop a repertoire and present it on tour. It gave Laubrock the opportunity to bring together musicians from her new living situation in New York, where she has been based since 2009, and musicians from London who had already been members of her earlier nonet.

Music
Laubrock brought eight compositions to the rehearsals in the SWR studio in Baden-Baden, seven of which are to be found in this CD. With the exception of "Blue Line & Sinker" which is a freely improvised introduction to the composition "Red Hook", some of the pieces are strictly  notated and, due to their complexity were even conducted (by Tom Rainey). Most of the compositions, however, despite their precisely notated formal structures also leave large open spaces for improvisation. Laubrock decided to release on CD the Zurich live concert, recorded by the public broadcaster, instead of the studio recordings.

Reception

The Down Beat review by Alain Drouot notes that "The lineup's wild card is Ted Reichman, whose haunting accordion leaves the strongest mark. His halo hovers over the soundscapes imagined by Laubrock, and his contributions greatly benefit the ensemble passages, which are by turn eerie, enigmatic or threatening."

The All About Jazz review by John Sharpe states "While the German has built her reputation as a distinctive voice on tenor and soprano saxophones and a compelling improviser, her writing is no less formidable and the seven numbers here share with her work for her group Anti-House an enigmatic and idiosyncratic shape, suggesting musical riddles."

Track listing
All compositions by Ingrid Laubrock except as indicated
 "Glasses" – 4:58
 "Novemberdoodle" – 11:04
 "Blue Linwe & Sinker" (Ted Reichman, Tom Rainey, Drew Gress) – 2:41
 "Chant" – 13:18
 "Matrix" – 12:48
 "Nightbus" – 18:29
 "Der Zauberberg" – 10:15

Personnel
Ingrid Laubrock – soprano sax,  tenor sax
Mary Halvorson – guitar
Tom Arthurs – trumpet
Ted Reichman – accordion
Liam Noble – piano
Ben Davis – cello
Drew Gress – bass
Tom Rainey – drums, xylophone

References

 
2014 live albums
Ingrid Laubrock live albums
Intakt Records live albums